Fábio Patrick dos Reis dos Santos Fernandes (born 13 December 1993), better known as Patrick Fernandes, is a Cape Verdean professional footballer who plays as a forward for the Portuguese club Torreense.

Club career
Patrick began playing football in Portugal in 2016 with Oliveira do Hospital, and had a prolific season with 22 goals in 27 games. He had another successful season with Felgueiras 1932 in 2017, and on 28 July 2018 signed his first professional contract with Tondela in the Primeira Liga.

On 8 August 2019, he moved to LigaPro club Farense on a two-year contract.

On 20 December 2022, Patrick signed with Torreense.

International career
Patrick made his debut for the Cape Verde national team in a 0–0 (4–3) penalty shootout win over Andorra on 3 June 2018.

References

External links
 
 

1993 births
Living people
Sportspeople from Praia
Cape Verdean footballers
Association football forwards
Cape Verde international footballers
Primeira Liga players
Liga Portugal 2 players
Campeonato de Portugal (league) players
Cape Verdean National Championships players
Boavista FC (Cape Verde) players
F.C. Oliveira do Hospital players
F.C. Felgueiras 1932 players
C.D. Tondela players
S.C. Farense players
Varzim S.C. players
G.D. Chaves players
S.C.U. Torreense players
Cape Verdean expatriate footballers
Cape Verdean expatriate sportspeople in Portugal
Expatriate footballers in Portugal